Mycale: Book of Angels Volume 13 is an album by the vocal group Mycale performing compositions from John Zorn's second Masada book, "The Book of Angels".   Ayelet Rose Gottlieb stated "We've been told that we have managed to create our own "language" within this a cappella quartet ... the foundation is our music are the compositions of John Zorn, which in this case are melodic tunes, based on the "jewish scale" ... but always with a twist that sends the pieces off to another place, beyond straight klezmer ... on top of that are our arrangements, and text choices."

Reception

Ian Flick awarded the album 3½ stars stating, "Overall, this is a very strange album and although it's not a hard or really taxing listen, it's just so off the wall I'm not sure I get it. There's just this atmosphere of pure strangeness that I just can't put my finger on whether this is good, bad, or just decent. If you want something totally avant-garde by one it's key players, check this out."

Track listing 
All compositions by John Zorn.
 "Uzziel" - 3:10   
 "Ahaha"- 2:53   
 "El El" - 2:19   
 "Tehom" - 2:26   
 "Moloch" - 2:32   
 "Balam" - 3:12   
 "Melech" - 2:47   
 "Tarshish" - 4:01   
 "Asaph" - 3:18   
 "Rumiel" - 2:55   
 "Natiel" - 4:10

Personnel 
 Ayelet Rose Gottlieb - voice 
 Sofia Rei Koutsovitis - voice 
 Basya Schecter - voice 
 Malika Zarra - voice

References 

2010 albums
Albums produced by John Zorn
Tzadik Records albums
Book of Angels albums